The 1944 VFL season was the 48th season of the Victorian Football League (VFL), the highest level senior Australian rules football competition in Victoria.

All twelve of the league's clubs competed, with  returning after two years in recess due to wartime travel restrictions. The season ran from 6 May until 30 September, and comprised an 18-game home-and-away season followed by a finals series featuring the top four clubs.

The premiership was won by the Fitzroy Football Club for the eighth and final time in its history, after it defeated  by 15 points in the VFL Grand Final.

Influence of World War II
The wartime travel restrictions that had forced Geelong into recess the previous two years were relaxed, and Geelong rejoined the competition.

Premiership season
In 1944, with Geelong competing again, the VFL competition once again consisted of twelve teams of 18 on-the-field players each, plus one substitute player, known as the 19th man. A player could be substituted for any reason; however, once substituted, a player could not return to the field of play under any circumstances.

Teams played each other in a home-and-away season of 18 rounds; and, as had been the case in 1926 and 1927, matches 12 to 18 were "irregular", with 12 to 17 being the "home-and-way reverse" of matches 1 to 6, and match 18 the "home-and-way reverse" of match 11.

The determination of the 1944 season's fixtures were greatly complicated by the fact that, although the Western Oval and the Junction Oval were now available to the VFL, the Melbourne Cricket Ground and the Lake Oval were still appropriated for military use and, because of this, Melbourne was sharing the Punt Road Oval with Richmond as its home ground, and South Melbourne was sharing the Junction Oval with St Kilda as its home ground.

Once the 18 round home-and-away season had finished, the 1944 VFL Premiers were determined by the specific format and conventions of the Page–McIntyre system.

Round 1

|- bgcolor="#CCCCFF"
| Home team
| Home team score
| Away team
| Away team score
| Venue
| Crowd
| Date
|- bgcolor="#FFFFFF"
| 
| 14.8 (92)
| 
| 19.18 (132)
| Punt Road Oval
| 15,000
| 6 May 1944
|- bgcolor="#FFFFFF"
| 
| 15.23 (113)
| 
| 8.7 (55)
| Western Oval
| 9,000
| 6 May 1944
|- bgcolor="#FFFFFF"
| 
| 11.16 (82)
| 
| 10.13 (73)
| Brunswick Street Oval
| 9,000
| 6 May 1944
|- bgcolor="#FFFFFF"
| 
| 9.14 (68)
| 
| 15.16 (106)
| Glenferrie Oval
| 12,000
| 6 May 1944
|- bgcolor="#FFFFFF"
| 
| 9.11 (65)
| 
| 14.17 (101)
| Arden Street Oval
| 6,000
| 6 May 1944
|- bgcolor="#FFFFFF"
| 
| 13.10 (88)
| 
| 9.7 (61)
| Junction Oval
| 20,000
| 6 May 1944

Round 2

|- bgcolor="#CCCCFF"
| Home team
| Home team score
| Away team
| Away team score
| Venue
| Crowd
| Date
|- bgcolor="#FFFFFF"
| 
| 9.11 (65)
| 
| 11.18 (84)
| Kardinia Park
| 8,000
| 13 May 1944
|- bgcolor="#FFFFFF"
| 
| 17.18 (120)
| 
| 16.4 (100)
| Windy Hill
| 12,000
| 13 May 1944
|- bgcolor="#FFFFFF"
| 
| 11.17 (83)
| 
| 19.17 (131)
| Victoria Park
| 15,500
| 13 May 1944
|- bgcolor="#FFFFFF"
| 
| 18.16 (124)
| 
| 9.14 (68)
| Princes Park
| 11,000
| 13 May 1944
|- bgcolor="#FFFFFF"
| 
| 18.11 (119)
| 
| 15.9 (99)
| Punt Road Oval
| 15,000
| 13 May 1944
|- bgcolor="#FFFFFF"
| 
| 12.17 (89)
| 
| 10.14 (74)
| Junction Oval
| 15,000
| 13 May 1944

Round 3

|- bgcolor="#CCCCFF"
| Home team
| Home team score
| Away team
| Away team score
| Venue
| Crowd
| Date
|- bgcolor="#FFFFFF"
| 
| 16.11 (107)
| 
| 11.16 (82)
| Brunswick Street Oval
| 12,000
| 20 May 1944
|- bgcolor="#FFFFFF"
| 
| 16.14 (110)
| 
| 22.19 (151)
| Windy Hill
| 21,000
| 20 May 1944
|- bgcolor="#FFFFFF"
| 
| 9.10 (64)
| 
| 7.10 (52)
| Junction Oval
| 20,000
| 20 May 1944
|- bgcolor="#FFFFFF"
| 
| 22.12 (144)
| 
| 13.13 (91)
| Glenferrie Oval
| 8,000
| 20 May 1944
|- bgcolor="#FFFFFF"
| 
| 16.9 (105)
| 
| 13.19 (97)
| Western Oval
| 11,000
| 20 May 1944
|- bgcolor="#FFFFFF"
| 
| 12.5 (77)
| 
| 14.8 (92)
| Punt Road Oval
| 15,000
| 20 May 1944

Round 4

|- bgcolor="#CCCCFF"
| Home team
| Home team score
| Away team
| Away team score
| Venue
| Crowd
| Date
|- bgcolor="#FFFFFF"
| 
| 10.9 (69)
| 
| 22.10 (142)
| Kardinia Park
| 8,000
| 27 May 1944
|- bgcolor="#FFFFFF"
| 
| 11.18 (84)
| 
| 12.18 (90)
| Victoria Park
| 13,000
| 27 May 1944
|- bgcolor="#FFFFFF"
| 
| 13.17 (95)
| 
| 14.9 (93)
| Princes Park
| 18,000
| 27 May 1944
|- bgcolor="#FFFFFF"
| 
| 9.12 (66)
| 
| 11.7 (73)
| Junction Oval
| 10,000
| 27 May 1944
|- bgcolor="#FFFFFF"
| 
| 15.14 (104)
| 
| 9.16 (70)
| Arden Street Oval
| 10,000
| 27 May 1944
|- bgcolor="#FFFFFF"
| 
| 14.13 (97)
| 
| 7.9 (51)
| Punt Road Oval
| 29,000
| 27 May 1944

Round 5

|- bgcolor="#CCCCFF"
| Home team
| Home team score
| Away team
| Away team score
| Venue
| Crowd
| Date
|- bgcolor="#FFFFFF"
| 
| 10.13 (73)
| 
| 13.8 (86)
| Punt Road Oval
| 8,000
| 3 June 1944
|- bgcolor="#FFFFFF"
| 
| 17.14 (116)
| 
| 11.14 (80)
| Windy Hill
| 7,000
| 3 June 1944
|- bgcolor="#FFFFFF"
| 
| 16.12 (108)
| 
| 14.8 (92)
| Princes Park
| 28,000
| 3 June 1944
|- bgcolor="#FFFFFF"
| 
| 10.12 (72)
| 
| 10.13 (73)
| Junction Oval
| 15,000
| 3 June 1944
|- bgcolor="#FFFFFF"
| 
| 8.15 (63)
| 
| 8.10 (58)
| Western Oval
| 9,000
| 3 June 1944
|- bgcolor="#FFFFFF"
| 
| 8.9 (57)
| 
| 10.13 (73)
| Glenferrie Oval
| 11,000
| 3 June 1944

Round 6

|- bgcolor="#CCCCFF"
| Home team
| Home team score
| Away team
| Away team score
| Venue
| Crowd
| Date
|- bgcolor="#FFFFFF"
| 
| 14.7 (91)
| 
| 10.17 (77)
| Brunswick Street Oval
| 20,000
| 10 June 1944
|- bgcolor="#FFFFFF"
| 
| 10.9 (69)
| 
| 15.9 (99)
| Victoria Park
| 10,000
| 10 June 1944
|- bgcolor="#FFFFFF"
| 
| 21.16 (142)
| 
| 17.11 (113)
| Arden Street Oval
| 10,000
| 10 June 1944
|- bgcolor="#FFFFFF"
| 
| 19.11 (125)
| 
| 18.17 (125)
| Punt Road Oval
| 22,000
| 10 June 1944
|- bgcolor="#FFFFFF"
| 
| 9.17 (71)
| 
| 9.17 (71)
| Junction Oval
| 19,000
| 10 June 1944
|- bgcolor="#FFFFFF"
| 
| 5.10 (40)
| 
| 13.25 (103)
| Kardinia Park
| 8,000
| 10 June 1944

Round 7

|- bgcolor="#CCCCFF"
| Home team
| Home team score
| Away team
| Away team score
| Venue
| Crowd
| Date
|- bgcolor="#FFFFFF"
| 
| 9.13 (67)
| 
| 8.10 (58)
| Western Oval
| 15,000
| 17 June 1944
|- bgcolor="#FFFFFF"
| 
| 14.13 (97)
| 
| 7.10 (52)
| Brunswick Street Oval
| 10,000
| 17 June 1944
|- bgcolor="#FFFFFF"
| 
| 12.21 (93)
| 
| 9.10 (64)
| Victoria Park
| 10,000
| 17 June 1944
|- bgcolor="#FFFFFF"
| 
| 15.20 (110)
| 
| 12.10 (82)
| Arden Street Oval
| 12,000
| 17 June 1944
|- bgcolor="#FFFFFF"
| 
| 25.23 (173)
| 
| 9.2 (56)
| Punt Road Oval
| 10,000
| 17 June 1944
|- bgcolor="#FFFFFF"
| 
| 6.12 (48)
| 
| 15.13 (103)
| Junction Oval
| 23,000
| 17 June 1944

Round 8

|- bgcolor="#CCCCFF"
| Home team
| Home team score
| Away team
| Away team score
| Venue
| Crowd
| Date
|- bgcolor="#FFFFFF"
| 
| 9.13 (67)
| 
| 13.14 (92)
| Kardinia Park
| 7,000
| 24 June 1944
|- bgcolor="#FFFFFF"
| 
| 21.18 (144)
| 
| 8.12 (60)
| Windy Hill
| 16,000
| 24 June 1944
|- bgcolor="#FFFFFF"
| 
| 17.12 (114)
| 
| 12.11 (83)
| Princes Park
| 21,000
| 24 June 1944
|- bgcolor="#FFFFFF"
| 
| 11.11 (77)
| 
| 17.10 (112)
| Junction Oval
| 25,000
| 24 June 1944
|- bgcolor="#FFFFFF"
| 
| 9.10 (64)
| 
| 14.18 (102)
| Glenferrie Oval
| 12,000
| 24 June 1944
|- bgcolor="#FFFFFF"
| 
| 7.10 (52)
| 
| 10.17 (77)
| Punt Road Oval
| 13,000
| 24 June 1944

Round 9

|- bgcolor="#CCCCFF"
| Home team
| Home team score
| Away team
| Away team score
| Venue
| Crowd
| Date
|- bgcolor="#FFFFFF"
| 
| 11.18 (84)
| 
| 7.11 (53)
| Punt Road Oval
| 16,000
| 1 July 1944
|- bgcolor="#FFFFFF"
| 
| 8.15 (63)
| 
| 8.13 (61)
| Western Oval
| 13,000
| 1 July 1944
|- bgcolor="#FFFFFF"
| 
| 15.12 (102)
| 
| 9.13 (67)
| Victoria Park
| 6,000
| 1 July 1944
|- bgcolor="#FFFFFF"
| 
| 15.12 (102)
| 
| 11.11 (77)
| Junction Oval
| 12,000
| 1 July 1944
|- bgcolor="#FFFFFF"
| 
| 12.11 (83)
| 
| 11.17 (83)
| Brunswick Street Oval
| 17,000
| 1 July 1944
|- bgcolor="#FFFFFF"
| 
| 11.15 (81)
| 
| 7.10 (52)
| Arden Street Oval
| 16,000
| 1 July 1944

Round 10

|- bgcolor="#CCCCFF"
| Home team
| Home team score
| Away team
| Away team score
| Venue
| Crowd
| Date
|- bgcolor="#FFFFFF"
| 
| 10.10 (70)
| 
| 9.13 (67)
| Punt Road Oval
| 10,000
| 8 July 1944
|- bgcolor="#FFFFFF"
| 
| 11.9 (75)
| 
| 13.16 (94)
| Glenferrie Oval
| 11,000
| 8 July 1944
|- bgcolor="#FFFFFF"
| 
| 13.9 (87)
| 
| 21.14 (140)
| Kardinia Park
| 6,500
| 8 July 1944
|- bgcolor="#FFFFFF"
| 
| 14.16 (100)
| 
| 8.13 (61)
| Windy Hill
| 13,000
| 8 July 1944
|- bgcolor="#FFFFFF"
| 
| 11.15 (81)
| 
| 6.15 (51)
| Princes Park
| 17,000
| 8 July 1944
|- bgcolor="#FFFFFF"
| 
| 17.11 (113)
| 
| 6.9 (45)
| Junction Oval
| 10,000
| 8 July 1944

Round 11

|- bgcolor="#CCCCFF"
| Home team
| Home team score
| Away team
| Away team score
| Venue
| Crowd
| Date
|- bgcolor="#FFFFFF"
| 
| 11.20 (86)
| 
| 7.11 (53)
| Arden Street Oval
| 10,000
| 15 July 1944
|- bgcolor="#FFFFFF"
| 
| 7.10 (52)
| 
| 22.25 (157)
| Glenferrie Oval
| 10,000
| 15 July 1944
|- bgcolor="#FFFFFF"
| 
| 25.29 (179)
| 
| 8.8 (56)
| Brunswick Street Oval
| 7,000
| 15 July 1944
|- bgcolor="#FFFFFF"
| 
| 7.15 (57)
| 
| 15.16 (106)
| Junction Oval
| 18,000
| 15 July 1944
|- bgcolor="#FFFFFF"
| 
| 16.17 (113)
| 
| 9.13 (67)
| Punt Road Oval
| 15,000
| 15 July 1944
|- bgcolor="#FFFFFF"
| 
| 13.8 (86)
| 
| 12.11 (83)
| Western Oval
| 17,000
| 15 July 1944

Round 12

|- bgcolor="#CCCCFF"
| Home team
| Home team score
| Away team
| Away team score
| Venue
| Crowd
| Date
|- bgcolor="#FFFFFF"
| 
| 19.18 (132)
| 
| 3.7 (25)
| Windy Hill
| 8,000
| 22 July 1944
|- bgcolor="#FFFFFF"
| 
| 13.11 (89)
| 
| 10.10 (70)
| Victoria Park
| 11,000
| 22 July 1944
|- bgcolor="#FFFFFF"
| 
| 10.14 (74)
| 
| 8.12 (60)
| Princes Park
| 15,000
| 22 July 1944
|- bgcolor="#FFFFFF"
| 
| 17.8 (110)
| 
| 9.15 (69)
| Punt Road Oval
| 19,000
| 22 July 1944
|- bgcolor="#FFFFFF"
| 
| 11.11 (77)
| 
| 14.17 (101)
| Kardinia Park
| 7,000
| 22 July 1944
|- bgcolor="#FFFFFF"
| 
| 12.16 (88)
| 
| 8.14 (62)
| Junction Oval
| 14,000
| 22 July 1944

Round 13

|- bgcolor="#CCCCFF"
| Home team
| Home team score
| Away team
| Away team score
| Venue
| Crowd
| Date
|- bgcolor="#FFFFFF"
| 
| 11.21 (87)
| 
| 14.2 (86)
| Arden Street Oval
| 22,000
| 29 July 1944
|- bgcolor="#FFFFFF"
| 
| 14.15 (99)
| 
| 11.10 (76)
| Western Oval
| 13,000
| 29 July 1944
|- bgcolor="#FFFFFF"
| 
| 8.30 (78)
| 
| 8.8 (56)
| Junction Oval
| 7,000
| 29 July 1944
|- bgcolor="#FFFFFF"
| 
| 11.12 (78)
| 
| 14.14 (98)
| Punt Road Oval
| 11,000
| 29 July 1944
|- bgcolor="#FFFFFF"
| 
| 12.17 (89)
| 
| 4.14 (38)
| Brunswick Street Oval
| 13,000
| 29 July 1944
|- bgcolor="#FFFFFF"
| 
| 10.2 (62)
| 
| 13.28 (106)
| Glenferrie Oval
| 11,000
| 29 July 1944

Round 14

|- bgcolor="#CCCCFF"
| Home team
| Home team score
| Away team
| Away team score
| Venue
| Crowd
| Date
|- bgcolor="#FFFFFF"
| 
| 7.12 (54)
| 
| 10.19 (79)
| Junction Oval
| 8,000
| 5 August 1944
|- bgcolor="#FFFFFF"
| 
| 11.20 (86)
| 
| 9.7 (61)
| Kardinia Park
| 7,000
| 5 August 1944
|- bgcolor="#FFFFFF"
| 
| 8.12 (60)
| 
| 15.9 (99)
| Victoria Park
| 9,000
| 5 August 1944
|- bgcolor="#FFFFFF"
| 
| 4.14 (38)
| 
| 8.6 (54)
| Princes Park
| 10,000
| 5 August 1944
|- bgcolor="#FFFFFF"
| 
| 11.12 (78)
| 
| 15.11 (101)
| Arden Street Oval
| 14,000
| 5 August 1944
|- bgcolor="#FFFFFF"
| 
| 11.17 (83)
| 
| 12.15 (87)
| Punt Road Oval
| 26,000
| 5 August 1944

Round 15

|- bgcolor="#CCCCFF"
| Home team
| Home team score
| Away team
| Away team score
| Venue
| Crowd
| Date
|- bgcolor="#FFFFFF"
| 
| 12.16 (88)
| 
| 12.16 (88)
| Glenferrie Oval
| 6,000
| 12 August 1944
|- bgcolor="#FFFFFF"
| 
| 12.6 (78)
| 
| 11.8 (74)
| Western Oval
| 16,000
| 12 August 1944
|- bgcolor="#FFFFFF"
| 
| 16.10 (106)
| 
| 7.14 (56)
| Brunswick Street Oval
| 22,000
| 12 August 1944
|- bgcolor="#FFFFFF"
| 
| 8.21 (69)
| 
| 8.8 (56)
| Punt Road Oval
| 4,500
| 12 August 1944
|- bgcolor="#FFFFFF"
| 
| 16.10 (106)
| 
| 8.22 (70)
| Junction Oval
| 7,500
| 12 August 1944
|- bgcolor="#FFFFFF"
| 
| 6.9 (45)
| 
| 14.20 (104)
| Windy Hill
| 20,000
| 12 August 1944

Round 16

|- bgcolor="#CCCCFF"
| Home team
| Home team score
| Away team
| Away team score
| Venue
| Crowd
| Date
|- bgcolor="#FFFFFF"
| 
| 6.12 (48)
| 
| 13.16 (94)
| Arden Street Oval
| 7,000
| 19 August 1944
|- bgcolor="#FFFFFF"
| 
| 13.14 (92)
| 
| 12.18 (90)
| Brunswick Street Oval
| 20,000
| 19 August 1944
|- bgcolor="#FFFFFF"
| 
| 18.20 (128)
| 
| 7.14 (56)
| Victoria Park
| 5,000
| 19 August 1944
|- bgcolor="#FFFFFF"
| 
| 13.13 (91)
| 
| 7.10 (52)
| Junction Oval
| 8,000
| 19 August 1944
|- bgcolor="#FFFFFF"
| 
| 10.12 (72)
| 
| 13.19 (97)
| Kardinia Park
| 8,250
| 19 August 1944
|- bgcolor="#FFFFFF"
| 
| 11.16 (82)
| 
| 8.16 (64)
| Punt Road Oval
| 38,000
| 19 August 1944

Round 17

|- bgcolor="#CCCCFF"
| Home team
| Home team score
| Away team
| Away team score
| Venue
| Crowd
| Date
|- bgcolor="#FFFFFF"
| 
| 12.12 (84)
| 
| 15.19 (109)
| Glenferrie Oval
| 5,000
| 26 August 1944
|- bgcolor="#FFFFFF"
| 
| 5.14 (44)
| 
| 9.15 (69)
| Western Oval
| 26,500
| 26 August 1944
|- bgcolor="#FFFFFF"
| 
| 28.21 (189)
| 
| 12.11 (83)
| Windy Hill
| 8,000
| 26 August 1944
|- bgcolor="#FFFFFF"
| 
| 23.28 (166)
| 
| 8.12 (60)
| Princes Park
| 7,000
| 26 August 1944
|- bgcolor="#FFFFFF"
| 
| 8.13 (61)
| 
| 17.14 (116)
| Junction Oval
| 16,000
| 26 August 1944
|- bgcolor="#FFFFFF"
| 
| 11.17 (83)
| 
| 15.12 (102)
| Punt Road Oval
| 8,000
| 26 August 1944

Round 18

|- bgcolor="#CCCCFF"
| Home team
| Home team score
| Away team
| Away team score
| Venue
| Crowd
| Date
|- bgcolor="#FFFFFF"
| 
| 17.24 (126)
| 
| 6.8 (44)
| Windy Hill
| 11,000
| 2 September 1944
|- bgcolor="#FFFFFF"
| 
| 10.8 (68)
| 
| 15.18 (108)
| Victoria Park
| 14,000
| 2 September 1944
|- bgcolor="#FFFFFF"
| 
| 13.10 (88)
| 
| 12.17 (89)
| Princes Park
| 34,000
| 2 September 1944
|- bgcolor="#FFFFFF"
| 
| 12.10 (82)
| 
| 16.15 (111)
| Junction Oval
| 7,000
| 2 September 1944
|- bgcolor="#FFFFFF"
| 
| 14.27 (111)
| 
| 6.13 (49)
| Punt Road Oval
| 4,000
| 2 September 1944
|- bgcolor="#FFFFFF"
| 
| 10.10 (70)
| 
| 15.15 (105)
| Kardinia Park
| 8,000
| 2 September 1944

Ladder

Finals

Semi finals

|- bgcolor="#CCCCFF"
| Home team
| Score
| Away team
| Score
| Venue
| Crowd
| Date
|- bgcolor="#FFFFFF"
| 
| 14.17 (101)
| 
| 8.4 (52)
| Junction Oval
| 24,542
| 9 September
|- bgcolor="#FFFFFF"
| 
| 10.10 (70)
| 
| 11.15 (81)
| Junction Oval
| 32,000
| 16 September

Preliminary Final

|- bgcolor="#CCCCFF"
| Home team
| Score
| Away team
| Score
| Venue
| Crowd
| Date
|- bgcolor="#FFFFFF"
| 
| 16.12 (108)
| 
| 12.15 (87)
| Junction Oval
| 38,000
| 23 September

Grand final

Fitzroy defeated Richmond 9.12 (66) to 7.9 (51), in front of a crowd of 43,000 people. (For an explanation of scoring see Australian rules football).

Awards
 The 1944 VFL Premiership team was Fitzroy's last premiership, and its last Grand Final appearance. The club would fail to achieve either feat again before merging at the end of 1996.
 The VFL's leading goalkicker was Fred Fanning of Melbourne with 87 goals.
 No Brownlow Medal was awarded in 1944.
 Geelong took the "wooden spoon" in 1944.
Fitzroy 11.12 (78) defeated  9.9 (63) in the Grand Final, played as a stand-alone match on Saturday 23 September at Victoria Park before a crowd of 7,500.

Notable events
 Geelong resumed its place in the VFL competition. Although the lifting of wartime rail and road transport restrictions removed one impediment to Geelong's immediate return to the VFL competition, as the club's committee had paid the £100 annual affiliation fees to the VFL in 1942 and 1943 out of their own pockets in order to keep Geelong "in the game", the VFL claimed that Geelong Football Club owed the VFL £1,000 and that it would not consider its application for readmission until the debt was repaid, which was raised amongst the committeemen and supporters. After an extended and heated meeting, with matters such as the extra costs to each of the other eleven teams associated with their travel to Geelong and Geelong's perceived lack of competitiveness due to its depleted playing list (the reality of this concern is attested by the fact that Geelong only won 7 of its 57 games in seasons 1944, 1945, and 1946) influencing the VFL delegates, a majority (but not a unanimous majority) of the delegates voted in favour of Geelong's readmission.
 The VFL returned to having twelve teams. The next time this would change would be forty-three years later in 1987 when West Coast and Brisbane were admitted as part of national expansion.
 The late arrival of the train from Melbourne delayed the start of Geelong's first 1944 home match for more than an hour.
 The VFA and the VFL actively discussed the prospects of merging the two competitions. There was groundswell support for a common set of rules and common control over the game, after the upheaval which had followed the Association legalising throwing the ball and ceasing to recognise the validity of VFL transfer clearances in 1938. However, the issues of representation at board level, Australian National Football Council representation, and a promotion and relegation structure between the VFA and VFL meant that the talks eventually failed.
 The Round 13 match between North Melbourne and Richmond is the only match in which a team has scored three goals fewer than its opponent, but scored enough behinds to win the match. In the same round, South Melbourne defeated Geelong by 22 behinds, the largest winning margin between teams which kicked the same number of goals.
 Richmond won the minor premiership by the narrowest margin ever, after finishing level on premiership points with Fitzroy, but ahead on percentage by only 0.06%pts – in absolute terms, a single extra point at any time during the season could have changed the outcome.
 Fourth place on the ladder was decided directly by the Round 18 match between Carlton and Footscray, who were placed fourth and fifth on the ladder at the start of the round. Scores were level when the final bell went – a draw was enough for Carlton to make the finals – but Footscray's Harry Hickey had a kick after the siren from 50m which only just travelled the distance, and went through off hands for the winning behind, which saw Footscray reach the finals.
 Richmond's centreman Jack Broadstock was reported for having "kicked or intended to kick" Fitzroy's half-forward flanker Noel Price in the Second Semi-Final, and he was suspended for eight weeks. The Richmond First Eighteen were so incensed at Broadstock's suspension that they decided to forfeit the Preliminary Final against Essendon. It was only after Richmond President Harry Dyke told them that he would field the Second Eighteen rather than forfeit the match that the senior players agreed to play.
 Fitzroy won its eighth (and last) premiership at the Junction Oval on a hot, blustery day in which many spectators walked long distances to and from the venue on account of a tram strike.

See also
 List of VFL debuts in 1944

References
 Hogan, P., The Tigers of Old, The Richmond Football Club, (Richmond), 1996. 
 Maplestone, M., Flying Higher: History of the Essendon Football Club 1872–1996, Essendon Football Club, (Melbourne), 1996. 
 Rogers, S. & Brown, A., Every Game Ever Played: VFL/AFL Results 1897–1997 (Sixth Edition), Viking Books, (Ringwood), 1998. 
 Ross, J. (ed), 100 Years of Australian Football 1897–1996: The Complete Story of the AFL, All the Big Stories, All the Great Pictures, All the Champions, Every AFL Season Reported, Viking, (Ringwood), 1996.

External links
 1944 Season – AFL Tables

Notes

Australian Football League seasons
Vfl season